The County of Tanjil (sometimes spelled Tangil) is one of the 37 counties of Victoria which are part of the cadastral divisions of Australia, used for land titles. It includes the coastal area around the Gippsland Lakes. The Mitchell River is the north-eastern boundary. Before the 1860s, the area was part of the former county of Bruce and part of Haddington.

Parishes 
Parishes include:
 Bairnsdale, Victoria
 Baw Baw, Victoria
 Bengworden, Victoria
 Bengworden West, Victoria
 Binnuc, Victoria
 Boola Boola, Victoria
 Boole Poole, Victoria
 Bow-Worrung, Victoria
 Briagolong, Victoria
 Bullung, Victoria
 Bundalaguah, Victoria
 Bundowra, Victoria
 Butgalla, Victoria
 Colquhoun, Victoria
 Coongulla, Victoria
 Coongulmerang, Victoria
 Denison, Victoria
 Gillum, Victoria
 Glenaladale, Victoria
 Glenmaggie, Victoria
 Goon Nure, Victoria
 Koorool, Victoria
 Maffra, Victoria
 Marlooh, Victoria
 Meerlieu, Victoria
 Monomak, Victoria
 Moodarra, Victoria
 Moolpah, Victoria
 Moormurng, Victoria
 Moornapa, Victoria
 Nap-nap-marra, Victoria
 Narrang, Victoria
 Narrobuk, Victoria
 Narrobuk North, Victoria
 Nindoo, Victoria
 Numbruk, Victoria
 Nuntin, Victoria
 Sale, Victoria
 Sargood, Victoria
 Stratford, Victoria
 Tanjil, Victoria
 Tanjil East, Victoria
 Telbit, Victoria
 Tinamba, Victoria
 Toolome, Victoria
 Toombon, Victoria
 Toongabbie North, Victoria
 Toongabbie South, Victoria
 Wa-de-lock, Victoria
 Walhalla, Victoria
 Walhalla East, Victoria
 Winnindoo, Victoria
 Woolenook, Victoria
 Wooundellah, Victoria
 Worrowing, Victoria
 Wrathung, Victoria
 Wrixon, Victoria
 Wurruk Wurruk, Victoria
 Wurutwun, Victoria
 Yangoura, Victoria
 Yeerik, Victoria
 Yeerung, Victoria

References
Vicnames, place name details
Research aids, Victoria 1910
   Map of the county of Tanjil showing colony and parish boundaries, main roads, telegraph lines and railways. J. Sands, 1886, National Library of Australia

Counties of Victoria (Australia)